Throughout its history Leeds has had several riots, often recurring in the same areas.  Below is a list of recorded riots that have taken place.  The most famous of these is perhaps the 1981 Chapeltown riot, which took place the same time as riots in London (Brixton), Birmingham (Handsworth) and Liverpool (Toxteth).

1735  Corn price riot  
1753  The turnpike riots
1754  Holbeck Chapel Riot
1800  Corn price riot  
1811  Corn price riot   
1842  The Chartist and Plug riots in Holbeck and Hunslet 
1844  The Military riot  
1865  Leeds dripping riot  
1890  The Gasworkers riot  
1893  Morley miners' riot  
1908  The suffragette riot  
1917  An anti-Jewish riot, Quarry Hill
27 September 1936  The Battle of Holbeck Moor
1975  Chapeltown riot (1975)
11 July 1981  Chapeltown riot (1981)
22 June 1987  Chapeltown riot (1987)
1995 Hyde Park Riot
2001  Harehills riot
2002 Leeds Festival riots
The 2011 England riots saw "pockets of disorder" in Leeds

References

Crime in Leeds
History of Leeds
 
Riots
Leeds
Riots in Leeds